Lake Morehurehu is a dune lake in the Northland Region of New Zealand. It is located to the Northeast of Te Kao on the Aupouri Peninsula.

The lake has 3 separate stream inlets, the lake discharges from the southeastern end of the lake through a wetland, which flows into Great Exhibition Bay on the peninsula's east coast.

The land use of the lake catchment is pine plantation forestry, the lake itself has a surrounding vegetative zone of manuka/hakea scrub.

The water quality of the lake is monitored by Northland Regional Council, and the environmental information can be viewed on the LAWA website.

See also
List of lakes in New Zealand

References

Morehurehu
Far North District